An election was  held on November 8, 2022, to elect all 50 members to North Carolina's Senate. The election coincided with the elections for other offices, including the U.S Senate, U.S. House of Representatives, and state house. The filing period lasted from February 24, 2022, to March 4, 2022, with the primary election being held on May 17, 2022 (prior to the redistricting challenges it was scheduled to be held on March 8, 2022). The elections were originally to be held under new districts passed by the General Assembly in Senate Bill 739 to account for population changes following the 2020 census, however, following a ruling by the North Carolina Supreme Court, the General Assembly redrew the maps (Senate Bill 744) to comply with the court's ruling.

Predictions

Results summary

Close races
Districts where the margin of victory was under 10%:

Incumbents defeated in the primary election

Democrats
District 3: Ernestine Bazemore lost renomination to Valerie Jordan.
District 19: Kirk DeViere lost renomination to Val Applewhite.

Republicans
District 1: Bob Steinburg lost renomination to fellow incumbent Norman Sanderson in a redistricting race.
District 47: Deanna Ballard lost renomination to fellow incumbent Ralph Hise in a redistricting race.

Incumbents defeated in the general election

Democrats
Toby Fitch (D-District 4), defeated by Buck Newton (R)

Open seats that changed parties
Ernestine Bazemore (D-District 3) lost re-nomination, seat won by Bobby Hanig (R)

Newly created seats
District 10 (Johnston County), won by Benton Sawrey (R)
District 13 (Wake County), won by Lisa Grafstein (D)
District 36 (Alexander, Wilkes, Surry, and Yadkin counties), won by Eddie Settle (R)

Detailed results

Districts 1-25

District 1
The new 1st district includes all of Dare, Hyde, Cateret, Pamlico, Washington, Chowan, Perquimans, and Pasquotank counties. It includes the home of incumbent Republicans Bob Steinburg, who has represented the 1st district since 2019, and Norman Sanderson, who has represented the 2nd district since 2013. Sanderson defeated Steinburg to win the Republican nomination.

District 2
The new 2nd district includes all of Beaufort, Craven, and Lenoir counties. The district includes the home of incumbent Republican Jim Perry, who has represented the 7th district since 2019. He is running for re-election.

District 3
The new 3rd district includes all of Warren, Northampton, Halifax, Martin, Bertie, Hertford, Gates, Camden, Currituck, and Tyrrell counties. Incumbent Democrat Ernestine Bazemore has represented the 3rd district since 2021. Valerie Jordan defeated Bazemore to win the Democratic nomination. State representative Bobby Hanig was unopposed for the Republican nomination.

District 4
The new 4th district includes all of Greene, Wayne, and Wilson counties. Incumbent Democrat Toby Fitch has represented the 4th district since 2018. State Representative Raymond Smith Jr. unsuccessfully challenged Fitch for the Democratic nomination. Former state senator Buck Newton won the Republican nomination.

District 5
The new 5th district includes all of Edgecombe and Pitt counties. Incumbent Democrat Donald Davis has represented the 5th district since 2013. Davis is retiring to run for Congress. State representative Kandie Smith won the Democratic nomination for the seat.

District 6
The new 6th district includes all of Onslow County. Incumbent Republican Michael Lazzara has represented the 6th district since 2021.

District 7
The new 7th district includes most of New Hanover County. The new district includes the home of incumbent Republican Michael Lee, who has represented the 9th district since 2021. The original democratic nominee was Jason Minnicozzi, however, Minnicozzi dropped out and was replaced on the ballot by Marcia Morgan.

District 8
The new 8th district includes all of Columbus and Brunswick counties as well as part of New Hanover county. Incumbent Republican Bill Rabon has represented the 8th district since 2011.

District 9
The new 9th district includes all of Jones, Duplin, Pender, and Bladen counties as well as most of Sampson county. The district includes the home of incumbent Republican Brent Jackson, who has represented the 10th district since 2011.

District 10
The new 10th district includes all of Johnston County and has no incumbent. Benton Sawrey won the Republican nomination.

District 11
The new 11th district includes all of Nash, Franklin, and Vance counties. Incumbent Republican Lisa Stone Barnes has represented the 11th district since 2021. She is running for re-election.

District 12
The new 12th district includes all of Harnett and Lee counties as well as a small portion of Sampson county. Incumbent Republican Jim Burgin has represented the 12th district since 2019. David Buboltz and Ernie Watson unsuccessfully challenged Burgin for the Republican nomination.

District 13
The new 13th district includes portions of northern Wake County and has no incumbent. Lisa Grafstein won the Democratic nomination. David Bankert won the Republican nomination.

District 14
The new 14th district includes portions of eastern Wake County. Incumbent Democratic Minority Leader Dan Blue has represented the 14th district since 2009.

District 15
The new 15th district includes portions of central Wake County. Incumbent Democrat Jay Chaudhuri has represented the 15th district and its predecessors since 2016.

District 16
The new 16th district includes portions of western Wake County. Incumbent Democrat Wiley Nickel has represented the 16th district since 2019. Nickel is running for congress and isn't seeking re-election. State Representative Gale Adcock has announced that she will seek the Democratic nomination for the seat.

District 17
The new 17th district includes portions of southern Wake County. Incumbent Democrat Sydney Batch has represented the 17th district since her appointment on January 11, 2021.

District 18
The new 18th district includes all of Granvile county as well a portion of northern Wake County. Incumbent Democrat Sarah Crawford has represented the 18th district since 2021. Crawford is running for the state house. E.C. Sykes won the Republican nomination.

District 19
The new 19th district includes most of Cumberland County. Incumbent Democrat Kirk deViere has represented the 19th district since 2019. Val Applewhite defeated deViere to win the Democratic nomination. Former Senator Wesley Meredith won the Republican nomination.

Democratic primary polling

District 20
The new 20th district includes all of Chatham County and portions of southern Durham County. Incumbent Democrat Natalie Murdock has represented the 20th district since 2020.

District 21
The new 21st district includes all of Moore County as well as portions of Northwestern Cumberland County. When the district was drawn it originally had no incumbent, but Republican Tom McInnis switched his residence to Moore County so that he could run for re-election in the new district.

District 22
The new 22nd district includes most of Durham County. Incumbent Democrat Mike Woodard has represented the 22nd district since 2013. Larry Coleman won the Republican nomination.

District 23
The new 23rd district includes all of Caswell, Person, and Orange counties. Incumbent Democrat Valerie Foushee has represented the 23rd district since 2013. Foushee is retiring to run for Congress. State Representative Graig Meyer won the Democratic nomination. Landon Woods won the Republican nomination.

District 24
The new 24th district includes all of Robeson, Hoke, and Scotland counties. The new district includes the home of incumbent Republican Danny Britt, who has represented the 13th district since 2017, and incumbent Democrat Ben Clark, who has represented the 21st district since 2013. Clark isn't seeking re-election.

District 25
The new 25th district includes all of Alamance County as well as portions of Northeastern Randolph County. The district includes the home of incumbent Republican Amy Galey, who has represented the 24th district since 2021.

Districts 26-50

District 26
The new 26th district includes all of Rockingham County as well as portions of northern and eastern Guilford County. The district includes the home of incumbent Republican President Pro Tempore Phil Berger, who has represented the 30th district and its predecessors since 2001.

District 27
The new 27th district includes portions of western and southern Guilford County. Incumbent Democrat Michael Garrett has represented the 27th district since 2019.

District 28
The new 28th district includes portions of central Guilford County. Incumbent Democrat Gladys Robinson has represented the 28th district since 2011.

District 29
The new 29th district includes all of Anson, Richmond, and Montgomery counties as well as portions of Randolph and Union counties. The district includes the home of incumbent Republicans Tom McInnis, who has represented the 25th district since 2015, and Dave Craven, who has represented the 26th district since 2020. McInnis switched his residence from Richmond County to Moore County and he will run for re-election in the new 21st district.

District 30
The new 30th district includes all of Davidson and Davie counties. The district includes the home of incumbent Republican Steve Jarvis, who has represented the 29th district since 2021. Former state Senator Eddie Gallimore unsuccessfully challenged Jarvis for the Republican nomination.

District 31
The new 31st district includes all of Stokes County as well as portions of northern and eastern Forsyth County. Incumbent Republican Joyce Krawiec has represented the 31st district since 2014.

District 32
The new 32nd district includes portions of western and southern Forsyth County. Incumbent Democrat Paul Lowe Jr. has represented the 32nd district since 2015.

District 33
The new 33rd district includes all Rowan and Stanly counties. Incumbent Republican Carl Ford has represented the 33rd district since 2019.

District 34
The new 34th district includes most of Cabarrus County. The district includes the home of incumbent Republican Paul Newton, who has represented the 36th district since 2017.

District 35
The new 35th district includes most of Union County and a small portion of southeastern Cabarrus County. Incumbent Republican Todd Johnson has represented the 35th district since 2019.

District 36
The new 36th district includes all of Alexander, Wilkes, Surry, and Yadkin counties. The district has no incumbent.  Eddie Settle won the Republican nomination defeating Former state senator Shirley Randleman, State Representative Lee Zachary, and Vann Tate.

District 37
The new 37th district includes all of Iredell County as well as a small portion of far northwestern Mecklenburg County. The district includes the home of incumbent Republican Vickie Sawyer, who has represented the 34th district since 2019. She is running for re-election. Tom Fyler unsuccessfully challenged Sawyer for the Republican nomination.

District 38
The new 38th district includes portions of eastern Mecklenburg County. Incumbent Democrat Mujtaba Mohammed has represented the 38th district since 2019.

District 39
The new 39th district includes portions of southwestern Mecklenburg County. Incumbent Democrat DeAndrea Salvador has represented the 39th district since 2021.

District 40
The new 40th district includes a portion of eastern Mecklenburg County. Incumbent Democrat Joyce Waddell has represented the 40th district since 2015.

District  41
The new 41st district includes portions of northern and western Mecklenburg County. Incumbent Democrat Natasha Marcus has represented the 41st district since 2019.

District 42
The new 42nd district includes portions of southeastern Mecklenburg County. The district includes the home of incumbent Democrat Jeff Jackson, who has represented the 37th district since 2014. Jackson retired to run for Congress. State Representative Rachel Hunt was unopposed for the Democratic nomination. Cheryl Russo won the Republican nomination, defeating former state Representative Scott Stone.

District 43
The new 43rd district includes most of Gaston County. Incumbent Republican Majority Leader Kathy Harrington has represented the 43rd district since 2011. She is not seeking re-election.

District 44
The new 44th district includes all of Cleveland and Lincoln counties as well as a small portion of Gaston county. Incumbent Republican Ted Alexander has represented the 44th district since 2019.

District 45
The new 45th district includes all of Catawba County as well as portions of eastern Caldwell County. The district includes the home of incumbent Republican Dean Proctor, who has represented the 42nd district since 2020.

District 46
The new 46th district includes all of Burke and McDowell counties as well as portions of eastern Buncombe county. Incumbent Republican Warren Daniel has represented the 46th district and its predecessors since 2011. Mark Crawford unsuccessfully challenged Daniel for the Republican nomination.

District 47
The new 47th district includes all of Alleghany, Ashe, Watauga, Avery, Mitchell, Yancey, and Madison counties, as well as portions of Caldwell and Haywood counties. The new district includes the homes of incumbent Republicans Ralph Hise, who has represented the 47th district since 2011, and Deanna Ballard, who has represented the 45th district since 2016. Hise defeated Ballard to win the Republican nomination.

District 48
The new 48th district includes all of Henderson, Polk, and Rutherford counties. Incumbent Republican Chuck Edwards has represented the 48th district since 2016. Edwards is retiring to run for congress. State representative Tim Moffitt is seeking the Republican nomination for the seat. The original Democratic nominee was Stephanie A. Justice, however, she dropped out and was replaced on the ballot by Jay Carey.

District 49
The new 49th district includes most of Buncombe County. Incumbent Democrat Julie Mayfield has represented the 49th district since 2021. Taylon Breeden and Sandra Kilgore unsuccessfully challenged Mayfield for the Democratic nomination.

District 50
The new 50th district includes all of Cherokee, Graham, Clay, Macon, Swain, Jackson, and Transylvania counties, as well as most of Haywood county. Incumbent Republican Kevin Corbin has represented the 50th district since 2021. He is running for re-election.

Notes

Partisan clients

References

External links

North Carolina senate
senate
2022